Leo the Deacon (born c. 950) was a Byzantine Greek historian and chronicler.

He was born around 950 at Kaloe in Asia Minor, and was educated in Constantinople, where he became a deacon in the imperial palace. While in Constantinople he wrote a history covering the reigns of Romanos II, Nikephoros II, John Tzimiskes, and the early part of the reign of Basil II. Often his observations were based on his experiences as an eyewitness to events. His writing style has been described as "Classical", as he employed language reminiscent of the poet Homer and other ancient Greek historians such as Agathias. 

Leo is particularly well known for his eyewitness description of Sviatoslav I of Kiev, who invaded Bulgaria in 969 and fought against Byzantine Imperial forces over its territory.

References
The History of Leo the Deacon: Byzantine military expansion in the tenth century. Introd., transl., and annotations by Alice-Mary Talbot and Denis F. Sullivan (Washington, DC, 2005).

External links
Leo's Greek text (ed. Migne) in Adobe format
Scan of text (ed. Niebuhr, CSHB) in Adobe
Text in Russian translation

950s births
10th-century Byzantine historians
Byzantine chroniclers
Year of birth uncertain
Year of death unknown